North is an unincorporated community in Mathews County, Virginia, United States. North has a post office with ZIP code 23128.

References

Unincorporated communities in Mathews County, Virginia
Unincorporated communities in Virginia